Sins of Our Youth is a 2014 thriller/drama film directed by Gary Entin and starring Lucas Till, Joel Courtney, and Mitchel Musso. The film is a cautionary tale that highlights a new generation in the United States that is desensitized by an oversaturation of violence in the mainstream media and who have ready access to firearms.

Plot
Four teenagers, Scott, David, Carlo, and Tyler, accidentally murder a younger boy while shooting off assault weapons recreationally, and make perilous decisions in the aftermath of the murder.

In a moment of desperation, paranoia, and fear that their lives are over, the four teenagers struggle to find a way out. They drunkenly construct a plan reminiscent of a video-game plot. Later, Scott shoots and kills Tyler at a school dance, but is shot and bleeds to death. Police surround the remaining two and Carlo commits suicide. The police think David is reaching for a gun and kill him, only for it to be revealed David was reaching for an inhaler.

Cast
 Lucas Till as Tyler
 Joel Courtney as David 
 Mitchel Musso as Scott
 Bridger Zadina as Carlo
 Ally Sheedy as Vicky
 Wesley Eure as Police Chief Kaplan

External links
 
 

2014 films
2014 thriller films
Films about school violence
Works about massacres in the United States
Works about gun politics in the United States
American thriller films
2010s English-language films
2010s American films